Eucalyptus williamsiana, commonly known as the large-leaved stringybark, is a species of small to medium-sized tree that is endemic to northern New South Wales. It has rough, stringy bark on the trunk and branches, broadly lance-shaped adult leaves, flower buds in groups of seven, white flowers and hemispherical fruit.

Description
Eucalyptus williamsiana is a tree that typically grows to a height of  but often less, and forms a lignotuber. Flowering has been recorded from January to February and the flowers are white.

Taxonomy and naming
Eucalyptus williamsiana was first formally described in 1990 by Lawrie Johnson and Ken Hill from specimens collected near the western edge of the Gibraltar Range National Park in 1985. The specific epithet (williamsiana) honours "J.B." Williams for his contribution to knowledge of the flora of the New England region.

Distribution and habitat
The large-leaved stringybark grows in woodland on the eastern side of the Northern Tablelands between Wallangarra in southern Queensland and Niangala in New South Wales. There is also a weakly naturalised population near Googong on the Southern Tablelands.

References

williamsiana
Myrtales of Australia
Flora of New South Wales
Flora of Queensland
Trees of Australia
Plants described in 1990